The sixth season of the Brazilian competitive reality television series No Limite, based on the international reality game show franchise Survivor, premiered on Tuesday, May 3, 2022, at  (BRT / AMT) on TV Globo.

On January 6, 2022, paracanoe athlete and former Big Brother Brasil 2 housemate Fernando Fernandes was officially announced as the new host for the series, replacing André Marques.

The season was filmed in the brazilian state of Ceará, marking the fourth time No Limite has filmed there (the first being 2000). The filming locations for this season were the same as those used in the fourth season, in Trairi.

The grand prize is R$500.000 with tax allowances and a brand new Jeep Renegade, plus a R$100.000 prize offered to the runner-up and a R$50.000 prize offered to the contestant in third place.

An early 15-minute preview of the season aired right before Globo's broadcast of the season finale of Big Brother Brasil 22 on April 26, 2022, where the 24 new castaways were revealed.

On July 7, 2022, Charles Gama won the competition with 51.42% of the public vote over runner-up Ipojucan Ícaro (24.43%) and third place finisher Lucas Santana (24.15%), thus becoming the show's first openly gay winner. This season creates the first ever all-male final two, with all the final four contestants also being men who identify as part of the LGBT community.

Contestants

Season summary

Voting history

Ratings and reception

Brazilian ratings
All numbers are in points and provided by Kantar Ibope Media.

No Limite – A Eliminação

References

External links
 No Limite on Gshow.com

2022 Brazilian television seasons
No Limite 6